"Someday We'll Know" is a song by the New Radicals. It was released in March 1999 as the second single off their album Maybe You've Been Brainwashed Too (1998). Lyrically, the song explores the confusion over why a relationship ended. The group dissolved before the single's release, and as a result the song failed to match the success of the preceding single, "You Get What You Give", which had topped the charts in New Zealand and Canada and peaked within the top 5 in the United Kingdom. In contrast, "Someday We'll Know" became a top 40 hit only in Brazil where it made Number 38, and failed to chart on the Billboard Hot 100. The song is the group's second and final single, and has been covered by numerous artists, including Mandy Moore & Jon Foreman of Switchfoot and Hall & Oates.

Composition 
The song is a midtempo ballad in which Alexander reflects on a past relationship and wonders why his girlfriend left him, eventually concluding that someday he'll know the answer. Rolling Stone called the song "reflective," while Consequence of Sound commented that the song is "relatable to the ever-been-broken-hearted with lines like 'I’m speeding by the place that I met you for the 97th time tonight' and 'If I could ask God just one question: Why aren’t you here with me tonight?”

Chart performance 
The single failed to match the success of the previous single, due in part to the announcement by lead group member Gregg Alexander that the New Radicals "[would] no longer be a recording, promoting, or performing entity" and that he would focus on producing and writing material for other artists, going on to state "the fatigue of traveling and getting three hours' sleep in a different hotel every night to do boring 'hanging and schmoozing' with radio and retail people is definitely not for me." The song received minimal promotion and was far less successful than its predecessor, "You Get What You Give". "Someday We'll Know" achieved its highest peak on the Billboard Adult Top 40 chart where it peaked at number 28 on August 7, 1999. The song failed to enter the Billboard Hot 100. The song debuted at number 48 on the UK Singles Chart on the chart dated 25 September 1999 and fell to number 76 the following week.

Music video
Directed by Lawrence Carroll, the video features the whole band playing the song in a damp warehouse with Gregg Alexander on guitar. It features scenes of people in different places: a laundromat, a bus, a diner, and a pool. In one scene, a lonely woman sits alone stirring her coffee, and the end of the video shows an empty seat at the back of a bus. The group disbanded while the music video was still being produced.

Track listing
 "Someday We'll Know" (Gregg Alexander, Danielle Brisebois, Debra Holland) – 3:39
 "The Decency League" (Alexander) – 3:30
 "Technicolor Lover" (Alexander) – 3:42
 "Someday We'll Know (Instrumental)" (Alexander, Brisebois, Holland) – 3:39

Cover versions
"Someday We'll Know" has been widely covered. The song was covered by Mandy Moore and Jon Foreman on the A Walk to Remember soundtrack, by Hall & Oates on their 2003 album Do It for Love and live by Ronan Keating during his 2002 tour, Destination Everywhere. The Hall & Oates version included a guest appearance by Todd Rundgren on guitar and vocals. An acoustic cover of the song was done by MYMP on their 2011 album The Unreleased Acoustic Collection. A cover of the song was also done by English-American folk rock band America on their 2011 album Back Pages.

Charts

References

External links
New Radicals lyrics.
"Someday We'll Know" chords
"The Decency League" chords

1999 singles
1998 songs
New Radicals songs
Songs written by Gregg Alexander
Songs written by Danielle Brisebois
Song recordings produced by Gregg Alexander
MCA Records singles
1990s ballads
Rock ballads